Manases Reyes Carpio, commonly known as Mans, is a Filipino lawyer who is the husband of vice president of the Philippines, Sara Duterte.

Early life and education
Manases Reyes Carpio was born to Lucas Claudio Carpio Jr., a lawyer and former Court of Appeals Justice Agnes Reyes-Carpio who retired in 2016. His grandfather Lucas Dumlao Carpio Sr., was a former Justice of the Peace (now equivalent to a trial court judge). His father's sister is the former Ombudsman Conchita Carpio Morales and his father's cousin is the former Supreme Court Senior Associate Justice Antonio Carpio who is also widely known as a critic of his father-in-law President Rodrigo Duterte's administration.

He graduated from the De La Salle University where he took his undergraduate degree in Political Science. Being born in a family of lawyers, he also followed in the footsteps of his lineage obtaining his Bachelor of Laws at the San Sebastian College – Recoletos. He also studied at the San Beda University where he met his wife, Sara Duterte.

Legal career
While his wife has been busy serving Davao City where she was first elected as Vice Mayor in 2007, Carpio engaged himself with private practice, establishing and managing his own law firm which he named the "Carpio & Duterte Lawyers" together with his wife Sara. Carpio later spent time with their law firm after the latter decided not to run for public office in 2013. Their law firm specializes in business, commercial, and labor litigation, and serves both civil and criminal cases. Among their client was Mighty Corporation, one of the largest cigarette manufacturers in the Philippines.

Personal life
Mans and Sara have three children: an adopted daughter, Mikhaila María, nicknamed "Sharky", and two biological sons, Mateo Lucas, nicknamed "Stingray", and Marko Digong, nicknamed "Stonefish". They were also known for having nicknames after aquatic animals. Both he and his sons are distancing themselves in the eyes of the public even though his wife is a prominent politician. Most notably, they were not present during the proclamation of his wife as the duly elected Vice President of the Philippines at the House of Representatives but they did attend the inauguration of his wife on June 19, 2022, at Davao City. However, he actively campaigned and participated in some of the campaign sorties of his wife where he became a proxy and gave speeches to his wife's supporters.

Controversy
Carpio was named and involved by former Senator Antonio Trillanes in the alleged smuggling at the Bureau of Customs. The Senator raised some questions when Carpio was found visiting the office of the Bureau of Customs numerous times and having been allegedly meeting with the former Customs Commissioner Nicanor Faeldon. His father-in-law, former President Rodrigo Duterte defended him by saying that it is his job to visit and defend his clients as a lawyer would normally do. Carpio dismissed the allegations of Trillanes, calling the latter as a "desperate rumormonger".

References

Filipino lawyers
Living people
Duterte family
1976 births